"French Kissing" is a song by German singer-songwriter Sarah Connor from her debut album, Green Eyed Soul (2001). Written and produced by Rob Tyger and Kay Denar, the track incorporates a sample of Blackstreet's 1996 hit song "No Diggity" featuring Dr. Dre and Queen Pen, as well an uncredited bassline from Eminem's 2000 song "Stan" featuring Dido and it includes vocal theme inspired by "Tom's Diner", a song performed by "Suzanne Vega".

Released on 20 August 2001 as the album's second single, the song saw moderate success when it reached the top thirty in Germany and Austria, but failed to make the top forty elsewhere. To date, "French Kissing" and 2008s "I'll Kiss It Away" are the only singles by Connor not having entered the top twenty of the German Singles Chart.

Track listings
European CD single
"French Kissing" (Radio/Video) – 3:36
"French Kissing" (Divine Dance Rmx) – 3:59

European CD maxi single
"French Kissing" (Radio/Video) – 3:36
"French Kissing" (Divine Dance Rmx) – 3:59
"French Kissing" (Gena B. Good Rmx) – 3:46
"French Kissing" (Xtended Version) – 5:02

Charts

Weekly charts

References

Songs about kissing
2001 singles
Sarah Connor (singer) songs
Songs written by Dr. Dre
Songs written by Teddy Riley
Songs written by Kay Denar
Songs written by Rob Tyger
2001 songs
X-Cell Records singles